Intolerable Cruelty is a 2003 American romantic comedy film directed and co-written by Joel and Ethan Coen, and produced by Brian Grazer and the Coens. The script was written by Robert Ramsey and Matthew Stone and Ethan and Joel Coen, with the latter writing the last draft of the screenplay. The film stars George Clooney, Catherine Zeta-Jones, Geoffrey Rush, Cedric the Entertainer, Edward Herrmann, Paul Adelstein, Richard Jenkins and Billy Bob Thornton. It premiered at the 60th Venice International Film Festival and was released in the United States on October 10, 2003.

Plot
Donovan Donaly, a TV soap opera producer, walks in on his wife Bonnie being intimate with an ex-boyfriend. He files for divorce, and Bonnie hires Miles Massey, a top divorce attorney and the inventor of the "Massey pre-nup", a completely foolproof prenuptial agreement. Miles wins a large property settlement against Donaly, leaving him broke.

Private investigator Gus Petch tails the wealthy and married Rex Rexroth on a drunken night out with a blonde. When they stop at a motel, Gus catches their tryst on video. He takes the video to Rex's wife, Marylin Rexroth, a marriage-for-money predator. She files for divorce, demanding a large property settlement. Unable to afford a divorce settlement, Rex hires Miles to represent him. Marylin's friend, serial divorcée Sarah Sorkin warns Marilyn that Miles will be a dangerous opponent.

Marylin and her lawyer, Freddy Bender fail to reach an agreement with Miles and Rex. Bored Miles asks the fascinating Marylin to dinner, where they flirt. While they are out, Petch breaks in and copies her address book for Miles, who has his assistant search among the names for Marylin's accomplice in predatory marriage. In court, Marylin feigns an emotional breakdown over Rex's infidelity, professing that she loved Rex unconditionally at first sight. Miles then calls "Puffy" Krauss von Espy, a Swiss hotel concierge located by his assistant. Puffy testifies that Marylin asked him to find her a marriage target who was very rich, foolish, and a philanderer whom she could easily divorce, and that he pointed her to Rex. The divorce is granted, but Marylin gets nothing.

Seeking revenge against Miles, Marylin finds the now-penniless Donaly living on the street, still clutching his Emmy statuette, and offers him a chance to reclaim his lost glory. Soon after, Marylin shows up at Miles' office with her new fiancé, oil millionaire Howard D. Doyle. Marylin insists on the Massey prenup, which will make it absolutely impossible for her to claim any of her fiancée's assets in the event of a divorce, over both Howard and Miles's objections. However, Howard destroys it during the wedding, as a demonstration of love.

Six months later, Miles goes to Las Vegas, Nevada to give the keynote address at a convention for divorce attorneys. He encounters Marylin, who has divorced Howard and presumably collected a sizable share of the Doyle Oil fortune. However, she admits that she is disenchanted with her wealthy but lonely life. Miles marries her on the spur of the moment, and signs the Massey prenup to prove that he has no interest in her fortune, but she tears it up. The next morning, Miles tells the convention that love is the most important thing, and that he is giving up divorce for pro bono work.

Shortly afterwards, Miles discovers that "Howard D. Doyle" is just an actor from one of Donaly's soap operas; Marylin tricked him, leaving his considerable wealth at risk. Desperate to save the firm's reputation, Miles' boss, Herb Myerson suggests hiring hitman "Wheezy Joe" to kill Marylin. Miles then learns that Marylin's ex-husband Rex has died without changing his will, leaving her his entire fortune. Since she is now the wealthier of the two parties, his assets are no longer at risk. A repentant Miles rushes to save Marylin from Joe, but Marilyn has already offered to pay him double to kill Miles instead. In the confusion of the ensuing struggle, Joe mistakes his gun for his asthma inhaler and accidentally kills himself.

Later, Miles, Marylin and their lawyers meet to negotiate a divorce. Miles pleads for a second chance and retroactively signs a Massey prenup. Realizing her own feelings for him, she tears it up, and they kiss. Marylin reveals that to get Donaly's help for supplying Howard, she gave him an idea for a hit TV show, restoring his fortunes in the process: America's Funniest Divorce Videos, with Gus as the host.

Cast
 George Clooney as Miles Massey
 Catherine Zeta-Jones as Marylin Hamilton Rexroth Doyle Massey
 Geoffrey Rush as Donovan Donaly
 Cedric the Entertainer as Gus Petch
 Edward Herrmann as Rex Rexroth
 Paul Adelstein as Wrigley
 Richard Jenkins as Freddy Bender
 Billy Bob Thornton as Howard D. Doyle
 Julia Duffy as Sarah Batista O'Flanagan Sorkin
 Jonathan Hadary as Heinz, the Baron Krauss von Espy
 Tom Aldredge as Herb Myerson
 Stacey Travis as Bonnie Donaly
 Wendle Josepher as Miles' Receptionist
 Jack Kyle as Ollie
 Isabell O'Connor as Judge Marva Munson
 Irwin Keyes as Wheezy Joe
 Colin Linden as Father Scot
 Kiersten Warren as Claire O'Mara
 Mia Cottet as Ramona Barcelona
 George Ives as Mrs. Gutman's lawyer
 Blake Clark as convention speaker
 Bridget Marquardt as Santa Fe tart #1
 Camille Anderson as Santa Fe tart #2
 Tamie Sheffield as Santa Fe tart #3
 Emma Harrison as Santa Fe tart #4
 Bruce Campbell as TV Surgeon

Development
Intolerable Cruelty is the Coens' first job as writers-for-hire. It was based on an original concept by John Romano, author of The Third Miracle (Agnieszka Holland, 1999) and had been developed into a screenplay by Robert Ramsey and Matthew Stone, who wrote Big Trouble (Barry Sonnenfeld, 2002) and Life (Ted Demme, 1999). Among the script doctors who took a pass on the screenplay was Carrie Fisher in 1994.

The script was passed among directors and writers for several years, usually starting from the Coens' version.

Production
Initially the screenplay was attached to Ron Howard and then Jonathan Demme, who had planned to cast Julia Roberts and Hugh Grant in the lead roles. After their planned film of James Dickey's novel To The White Sea fell through, the Coens signed to direct the movie and dug out their original script to work with. Filming began on 20 June 2002 after being delayed due to George Clooney's schedule. Most of the film was shot around Beverly Hills; some was filmed in Las Vegas during a week at the end of production. With a budget of $60 million, it is the most expensive film directed by the Coens.

Reception

Critical response
On review aggregator Rotten Tomatoes, the film has an approval rating of 75% based on 187 reviews, with an average rating of 6.80/10. The website's critical consensus reads, "Though more mainstream than other Coen films, there are still funny oddball touches, and Clooney and Zeta-Jones sizzle like old-time movie stars." Metacritic assigned the film a weighted average score of 71 out of 100, based on 40 critics, indicating "generally favorable reviews." Audiences polled by CinemaScore gave the film an average grade of "C+" on an A+ to F scale.

Box office
The film opened with a gross of $12.5 million. By the end of its run, it had grossed $35.3 million in the United States and $85.5 million in other countries for a worldwide total of $120.8 million.

Soundtrack

Intolerable Cruelty is scored by Carter Burwell, in his tenth collaboration with the Coen Brothers.

The soundtrack album features a variety of pop songs and cues from Burwell's score. "The Boxer", first by Simon and Garfunkel and then as covered by Colin Linden, opens and closes the album. A Canadian blues musician, Linden had previously participated in Down from the Mountain, a live performance of music from the Coens' O Brother, Where Art Thou?, and he performs several Simon and Garfunkel songs in the film, including a snippet of Punky's Dilemma ("I wish I was a Kellogg's Corn Flake"), not included on the soundtrack release. Other songs include "Suspicious Minds" by Elvis Presley, "Non, Je Ne Regrette Rien" by Édith Piaf and "Glory of Love" by Big Bill Broonzy.

 
Tracks by Carter Burwell unless otherwise noted.
 "The Boxer" (Simon and Garfunkel) – 5:09
 "Intolerable Mambo" – 1:41
 "Suspicious Minds" (Elvis Presley) – 4:33
 "Hanky Panky Choo Choo" – 2:07
 "Don't Cry Out Loud" (Melissa Manchester) – 3:48
 "Feels So Good" (Chuck Mangione) – 9:42
 "You Fascinate Me" – 1:40
 "April Come She Will" (written by Paul Simon, performed by Colin Linden) – 0:59
 "Heather 2 Honeymoon" – 1:39
 "If I Only Knew" (Tom Jones) – 4:18
 "Love Is Good" – 3:26
 "Non, Je Ne Regrette Rien" (Édith Piaf) – 2:21
 "No More Working" – 3:01
 "Fully Exposed" – 1:46
 "Glory of Love" (Big Bill Broonzy) – 2:20
 "The Boxer" (Colin Linden) – 2:20

References

External links

 
 
 
 
 

2003 romantic comedy films
2003 films
American romantic comedy films
2000s English-language films
Films produced by Brian Grazer
Films directed by the Coen brothers
Imagine Entertainment films
Universal Pictures films
Films shot in Los Angeles
Films about divorce
Films scored by Carter Burwell
2000s American films